Rendezvous Sports World Private Limited (RSW) was a cricket franchise in the Indian Premier League which had 10% of equity on Kochi IPL Team. Rendezvous Sports World Limited is a consortium made up of multiple companies. It had made the winning bid of USD 333 million in a global invitation to tender process called by the IPL for two new franchises from IPL season 2011.

In April 2010, it threatened to sue IPL commissioner Lalit Modi for breaking confidentiality terms by disclosing details of the stakeholders in the new Kochi IPL team on the micro-blogging website Twitter.

Modi further revealed that of the Rendezvous 25% free, 18 percent share (4.5% of total equity worth Rs. 70 Crores) is held as sweat equity by Sunanda Pushkar, who was then a female friend and later wife of Congress Politician Shashi Tharoor. Later amidst demands for Tharoor's resignation from the Union Cabinet by the opposition parties for alleged corruption, Sunanda Pushkar "voluntarily" gave up the sweat equity.

References

External links 
Who is Rendezvous Sports World Limited
Who owns Rendezvous Sports World - IPL Kochi Franchise
Tharoor inspired Rendezvous Sports to bid for Kochi 

Indian Premier League franchise owners